The flora of Canada is quite diverse, due to the wide range of ecoregions and environmental conditions present in Canada.  From the warm, temperate broadleaf forests of southern Ontario to the frigid Arctic plains of Northern Canada, from the wet temperate rainforests of the west coast to the arid deserts, badlands and tundra plains, the biodiversity of Canada's plants is extensive. According to environment Canada the nation of Canada hosts approximately 17,000 identified species of trees, flowers, herbs, ferns, mosses and other flora.  About 4,100 species of vascular plants are native to Canada, and about 1,200 additional non-native species are recorded as established outside cultivation there.

Lists of all plants 

 List of Canadian plants by family
 A | B | C | D | E | F | G | H | I J K | L | M | N | O | P Q | R | S | T | U V W | X Y Z
 List of Canadian plants by genus
 A | B | C | D | E | F | G | H | I J K | L | M | N | O | P Q | R | S | T | U V W | X Y Z

Lists of plant types 
 Conifers
 Bryophytes
 Trees

See also

Wildlife of Canada
 Forests of Canada
 Gypsum flora of Nova Scotia

References

Further reading  

 
 Brouillet, L., F. Coursol, M. Favreau, M. Anions, P. Bélisle & P. Desmet. 2010+ VASCAN, the Database of Vascular Plants of Canada.
 Species List for Vascular Plants, Ontario Ministry of Natural Resources Natural Heritage Information Centre retrieved May 2006.
 S.J. Meades, D. Schnare, K. Lawrence and C. Faulkner. (2004 onwards).  Northern Ontario Flora Database Website Version 1, January 2004. Algoma University College and Great Lakes Forestry Centre, Sault Ste. Marie, Ontario, Canada.

External links 

Wildlife, plants and species ~ Government of Canada 
Species at Risk Public Registry A to Z Species Index